CGS Simcoe was a lighthouse supply and buoy vessel of the Canadian government acquired for service on the Great Lakes. Entering service in 1909, Simcoe was active until 1917 when the vessel foundered while transiting to Saint John, New Brunswick with the loss of 44 persons.

Description
Simcoe was a lighthouse supply and buoy vessel of steel construction designed for service on the Great Lakes. The vessel was powered by two triple expansion steam engines driving two screws generating  (nominal).

Construction and career
Simcoe was ordered from Swan Hunter and Wigham Richardson Limited to be constructed in their yard at Wallsend, England. The ship was launched on 21 January 1909 and completed in March of the year. Simcoe was one of two vessels acquired at the time for permanent service on the Great Lakes. She was homeported in Parry Sound, Ontario.

Simcoe was ordered to the East Coast of Canada to replace Dollard. Based at Saint John, New Brunswick, the vessel was travelling from Sydney, Nova Scotia, having stopped en route at Bird Island Lighthouse to drop off supplies, to Saint John when the ship encountered a storm. On 7 December 1917, the vessel sank near the Magdalen Islands with all 44 people aboard. Only one distress signal was received before contact was lost with the ship.

Citations

Sources
 
 

1909 ships
Ships built on the River Tyne
Navaids tenders of the Canadian Coast Guard
Shipwrecks in the Gulf of Saint Lawrence
Ships built by Swan Hunter
Canadian Government Ship